Cervera de Buitrago is a municipality of the autonomous community of Madrid in central Spain. It belongs to the comarca of Sierra Norte.

Local curiosities

The village has been occasionally mentioned in journalism and literature devoted to curiosities for a reported high frequency of polydactyly among its inhabitants, whereby six or seven fingers are found per hand or foot. Fantastical literature also mentions UFO activity in the area.

References

Municipalities in the Community of Madrid